Nadia Hai (born 8 March 1980) is a French politician of La République En Marche! (LREM) who served as Secretary of State to Minister of Territorial Development Jacqueline Gourault in the government of Prime Minister Jean Castex from 2020 to 2022. She previously served as member of the French National Assembly from the 2017 elections, representing the department of Yvelines. She lives and works in Paris.

Early career
Hai worked for 13 years for HSBC before joining Barclays as a wealth management advisor.

Political career
In February 2017, Hai got involved in politics by participating in the creation of Femmes en marche avec Macron, a group in support of presidential candidate Emmanuel Macron.

In parliament, Hai serves on the Finance Committee. In that capacity, she was the parliament’s rapporteur on reform of the solidarity tax on wealth (ISF). From 2018 until 2019, Hai served as the only member of parliament on a Special Committee for the Evaluation of Capital Tax Reforms, including the ISF. In a 2019 vote, she challenged incumbent quaestor Laurianne Rossi but ultimately lost.

In addition to her committee assignments, Hai was a member of the French-Moroccan Parliamentary Friendship Group.

Political positions
In July 2019, Hai voted in favor of the French ratification of the European Union’s Comprehensive Economic and Trade Agreement (CETA) with Canada.

See also
 2017 French legislative election

References

1980 births
Living people
Deputies of the 15th National Assembly of the French Fifth Republic
La République En Marche! politicians
21st-century French women politicians
People from Trappes
Politicians from Île-de-France
Women members of the National Assembly (France)
French people of Moroccan descent
Members of Parliament for Yvelines